William Ferreira Martínez (born February 25, 1983, in Artigas) is a Uruguayan football striker. He currently plays for Club Always Ready in the Primera División de Bolivia.

Career
Ferreira began his footballing career with Uruguayan giant Nacional, where he was part of a national title in 2002. After two more years with the tricolor, he transferred to Fénix. In 2006 Ferreira joined Rampla Juniors, but returned to Fénix the following season. In 2008, he played for Defensor Sporting, which won the national league title that year. In 2009, he moved to Bolivia and signed for Bolívar. During the Apertura tournament Ferreira had the best season of his career yet. His presence was fundamental as he scored 16 goals in 21 games; becoming the league top scorer and helping the club in adding another championship trophy to its showcase. In the Clausura 2009, he also finished in the top of the list with 9 goals, and netted 4 more in the playoffs stage, totalling 29 for the year. On 31 January 2011 makes official its assignment with option to buy the Spanish club Real Valladolid of Spanish football but FIFA rejected the international transfer after the TAS rejected the interim suspension as the player returned to Bolívar until further notice.

Club titles

Honours

External links
 
 
 

Living people
1983 births
People from Artigas Department
Uruguayan footballers
Uruguayan expatriate footballers
Association football defenders
Uruguayan Primera División players
Liga MX players
Club Nacional de Football players
Centro Atlético Fénix players
Defensor Sporting players
Rampla Juniors players
Club Bolívar players
Club Always Ready players
Leones Negros UdeG footballers
Expatriate footballers in Bolivia
Expatriate footballers in Mexico
Uruguayan expatriate sportspeople in Bolivia
Uruguayan expatriate sportspeople in Mexico